Patricia Herlihy (June 1, 1930 – October 24, 2018) was an American historian and author specializing in Russian and Soviet history.

Early life
When Herlihy was six months old her recently divorced mother moved to China, where they lived for five years. During this time, she learned Chinese, German and some English.

In adolescence, she met her future husband, David Herlihy, and together they lived and studied in Pisa and Florence, and also lived in France for a year. One of their sons is the historian of bicycles, David V. Herlihy.

Academic career
After returning to the United States, Herlihy taught Russian history at the Harvard Extension School.  In 1985 Herlihy visited Odesa, Ukraine for three months, which would later be the subject of several books and articles.

After returning to the United States, the Herlihys accepted tenured positions at Brown University, where she continued to work.  She also taught at Emmanuel College.

Notes

Works

Books
 
  (1991 paperback reprint).

Articles
  In the book Commerce in Russian Urban Culture 1861–1914.

External links
 

Historians of Russia
Historians of Ukraine
21st-century American historians
Harvard University faculty
Brown University faculty
2018 deaths
American women historians
Russian women historians
21st-century American women writers
21st-century Russian women writers
1930 births
Harvard Extension School faculty